Taylor Townsend was the defending champion, but lost in the first round to wildcard Erica Oosterhout.

Katerina Stewart won the title, defeating Louisa Chirico in an all-American final, 6–4, 3–6, 6–3.

Seeds 

 Louisa Chirico would have been second seeded, but entered late and had to qualify.

Main draw

Finals

Top half

Bottom half

References 
 Main draw

Revolution Technologies Pro Tennis Classic - Singles